Evan Rachel Wood is an American actress and musician. After playing minor roles in several films and television shows, Wood starred in her breakthrough role in Catherine Hardwicke's teen drama Thirteen (2003). Her performance in the film garnered widespread critical acclaim and earned her nominations for the Golden Globe Award for Best Actress in a Motion Picture – Drama, the Screen Actors Guild Award for Outstanding Performance by a Female Actor in a Leading Role, and the Critics' Choice Movie Award for Best Young Performer. Wood starred in the 2011 television adaptation of James M. Cain's Mildred Pierce, which garnered her nominations for the Primetime Emmy Award for Outstanding Supporting Actress in a Limited Series or Movie and the Golden Globe Award for Best Supporting Actress – Series, Miniseries or Television Film.

For portraying Dolores Abernathy in the HBO series Westworld (2016–), based on the film of the same name and sequel of the film, she received two nominations for the Primetime Emmy Award for Outstanding Lead Actress in a Drama Series, the Golden Globe Award for Best Actress – Television Series Drama, and the Saturn Award for Best Supporting Actress on Television, and went on to win the Critics' Choice Television Award for Best Actress in a Drama Series. She also, along with the other Westworld cast members, received a nomination for the Screen Actors Guild Award for Outstanding Performance by an Ensemble in a Drama Series for the first season.

Awards and nominations

References

External links 
 

Wood, Evan Rachel